Ferial Karim  (Firial Karim; 16 April 1938 – 4 July 1988) was a Lebanese actress and singer known for her comedian roles and parodies. Ferial was introduced to show business at a very young age by her father, she garnered popular acclaim and traveled back to Lebanon where she continued performing until she died on stage at the age of fifty.

Early life
Ferial Karim was born Vera Semaan to a Christian family on April 16, 1938 to Bechara, a postal office clerk and Marie, a housewife. Karim had five siblings, four girls and a brother; she received preferential treatment from her parents ever since she was diagnosed with rheumatic heart disease; she enjoyed and got away with mimicking her parents' guests and her teachers.

Karim's maternal cousin Alexandra Badran was an actress and singer who was known as Nour al-Hoda. Alexandra encouraged Karim's father Bechara to pursue a singing career for his eldest daughter Isabelle in Egypt. Bechara took both his daughters with him where the ten-year-old Karim took on the stage while a band was practicing and began singing Thuraya Helmi songs. Karim attracted attention of Egyptian movie producers and was cast as a child prodigy Ferial in Ibrahim Lama's movie Sikkat as-Salamah (The safety track); Karim adopted the nickname for her artistic career.

Marriage
Karim's acting career in Cairo's Farouq theater introduced her to a Lebanese singer Mohammad Karim. In 1954, the sixteen-year-old Karim married Mohammad who was many years her senior. Mohammad quit his singing career and dedicated his life to promote Karim's talent. The couple had two children, Mona and Samir.

Career
Karim and Mohammad moved to Damascus where she performed on stage for seven years before returning to Beirut where her sister Isabelle who was working in the national radio introduced her screenwriter Mohammad Chamel with whom she would have a long lasting artistic cooperation beginning with Ya mudir on the radio and ending with el-dunia heik on Lebanese national television.

Death
Karim died of heart failure while performing on stage on July 4, 1988 and was buried in Saint Elias Btina church in Beirut two days later.

Filmography

References

Lebanese film actresses
Lebanese television actresses
Lebanese comedians
20th-century Lebanese women singers
1938 births
1988 deaths
20th-century Lebanese actresses
Actresses from Beirut
20th-century comedians